is a Japanese garden located in the city of Tsuyama, Okayama Prefecture, Japan.  Shūraku-en was built in 1658 by Mori Nagatsugu, daimyō of Tsuyama Domain.

History
Mori Nagatsugu invited gardeners of the Kobori Enshū school from Kyoto to create a daimyō garden with a walking path around a pond, based on the gardens of the Sento Imperial Palace of the Kyoto Imperial Palace. Construction work was from 1655 to 1658, and the resultant garden covered  (256 meters from east-to-west by 292 meters form north-to-south), or approximately three times the size of the surviving portion of the garden today. Under the Matsudaira clan, who succeeded the Mori clan as rulers of Tsuyama, the garden was used as the Gotaimenjo (御対面所) for audiences or diplomacy. None of the buildings from the Edo period remain.  The garden was given the name "Shūraku-en" in 1870. 

Most of the garden is occupied by a long pond in the north-south direction, with four islands. With the Chugoku Mountains to the north as borrowed scenery, the pond in the north is placed so as to be approached by artificial hills in the east and north, and a 210-meter-long winding stream flows on the east side. There are few artificial structures such as tōrō lanterns, as the characteristic of the garden is that it is integrated with nature. The present buildings along the shore of the pond are all reconstructions. It is open to the public free as a citizen's park. However, it is closed at night.

Gallery

See also
 List of Places of Scenic Beauty of Japan (Okayama)
Tsuyama Castle
Tsuyama Domain

References

External links 

 Tsuyama City official web site - Shūraku-en 
 Thuyama Kawara Ban - Shūraku-en 

Gardens in Japan
Tsuyama
Gardens in Okayama Prefecture
Tourist attractions in Okayama Prefecture
Places of Scenic Beauty